Hayes Knoll is a hamlet between Swindon and Cricklade in north Wiltshire, England.

The North Wilts Canal, which linked the Wilts & Berks Canal at Swindon with the Thames and Severn Canal at Latton, north of Cricklade, passed close to the hamlet, where there was a lock. The canal was opened in 1819 and abandoned in 1914; since 2007 it has been under restoration as part of the Cricklade Country Way.

The hamlet has given its name to Hayes Knoll station on the Swindon and Cricklade Railway.

References

External links

Hamlets in Wiltshire